Fierzë may refer to several features in Albania:

 Fierzë, Elbasan, a village in the municipality of Belsh, Elbasan County
 Fierzë, Lezhë, a village in the municipality of Mirditë, Lezhë County
 Fierzë, Shkodër, a village in the municipality of Fushë-Arrëz, Shkodër County
 Fierzë, Kukës, a village in the municipality of Tropojë, Kukës County
 Fierza Reservoir
 Fierza Hydroelectric Power Station